The Guyana Girl Guides Association (GGGA) is the national Guiding organization of Guyana. It serves 3,719 members (as of 2018). Founded in 1922, the girls-only organization became a full member of the World Association of Girl Guides and Girl Scouts in 1969. 

Guiding started in 1922 in Berbice, and became a branch association of the Guide Association in the United Kingdom in 1924. It is the country's oldest association dedicated to the social development and wellness of girls and young women. 

In 2019, first lady Sandra Granger was patron of the Guyana Girl Guides Association.

Program 
The association is divided in four sections according to age:
 Sunflowers - ages 3 to 7
 Brownie Guide - ages 7 to 11
 Girl Guide - ages 11 to 15
 Ranger Guide - ages 15 to 19

Structure 
Units are usually affiliated with a school, including Leeds Primary, Rose Hall Estate Primary, St. Aloysius Primary, Tagore Memorial, All Saints Primary, East Canje Secondary, Buxton, Ann's Grove, Plaisance, Tutorial, Pavilion, Sophia and West Demerara, St Paul’s Plaisance, Bishops' High School. 

The local units are grouped in divisions, among them the division "East Coast of Demerara".

GGGA is a member of the Caribbean Link for Guiding within the Western Hemisphere Region of the World Association of Girl Guides and Girl Scouts.

Activities 
Their yearly event World Thinking Day on February 22 "is a day of international friendship, speaking out on issues that affect girls and young women, and fundraising for 10 million Girl Guides and Girl Scouts around the world."

See also
 The Scout Association of Guyana

Sources

World Association of Girl Guides and Girl Scouts member organizations
Scouting and Guiding in Guyana
Youth organizations established in 1922
1922 establishments in British Guiana